Huércal de Almería is a municipality of Almería province, in the autonomous community of Andalusia, Spain.

Demographics

Notable people
Joaquín Fernández (born 1996), footballer

References

External links
  Huércal de Almería - Sistema de Información Multiterritorial de Andalucía
  Huércal de Almería - Diputación Provincial de Almería

Municipalities in the Province of Almería